I Beg of You is a song written by Rose Marie McCoy and Kelly Owens. It was recorded by Elvis Presley.

Single track listing

Chart performance

References

1957 singles
Elvis Presley songs
1957 songs
Songs written by Rose Marie McCoy